Jeff Steven Meendering (born May 21, 1977) is an American NASCAR crew chief. He served as crew chief for Jeff Gordon (No. 24 Hendrick Motorsports) and Bobby Labonte (No. 43 Petty Enterprises) in 2007 and 2008, respectively. He worked at Stewart-Haas Racing in 2018, serving as the crew chief for the No. 00 Ford Mustang driven by Cole Custer in the NASCAR Xfinity Series. He currently works at Joe Gibbs Racing, serving as the crew chief for the No. 18 Toyota Supra driven by Sammy Smith in the NASCAR Xfinity Series. They are both competing in the 2023 season.

References

1977 births
Living people
People from Grand Rapids, Michigan
NASCAR crew chiefs